The Endeavour 40 is an American sailboat that was designed by Robert K. Johnson as a cruiser and first built in 1981.

Production
The design was built by the Endeavour Yacht Corporation in the United States. The company built about 185 examples between 1981 and 1985, but it is now out of production.

Design
The Endeavour 40 was intended for both the private owner's market and yacht charter operators and was intended to compete directly with boats built by Gulfstar Yachts, as both company principals, John Books and Rob Valdes has previously worked for Gulfstar.

The Endeavour 40 is a recreational keelboat, built predominantly of polyester resin and fiberglass woven roving and multi-directional chopped strand fiber, with teak wood trim. It has a center cockpit, masthead sloop rig or optional ketch rig, with aluminum spars, a raked stem, a reverse transom, a skeg-mounted rudder controlled by a wheel and a fixed fin keel. It displaces  and carries  of structural lead ballast.

The design has sleeping accommodation for six people, with a double "V"-berth in the bow cabin, two straight settees in the main cabin and an aft cabin with a double berth. The main cabin features a folding dining table with two drop-leaves. The galley is located on the port side just aft of the companionway ladder. The galley is "L"-shaped and is equipped with a three-burner alcohol-fired stove and a double sink with hot and cold pressurized water and a fresh water pump, plus a refrigerator. A navigation station is opposite the galley, on the starboard side. There are two heads, one just aft of the bow cabin on the starboard side that includes a shower and one on the port side in the aft cabin. The engine room is located centrally, under the companionway ladder. The cabin is trimmed in teak.

Ventilation is provided by 16 ports that open and four hatches.

For sailing the mainsail has a mainsheet traveler at the aft of the center cockpit, two winches for the genoa sheets and one for the mainsheet, plus two winches for the main and genoa halyards. The boat is equipped with a topping lift and slab reefing.

The design has a PHRF racing average handicap of 126.

Operational history
In a 1994 review Richard Sherwood wrote that the Endeavour 40 "is a big, comfortable cruiser intended for extended trips. Note that both fuel and water capacity are high. Ballast/displacement ratio is 36 percent. The cockpit, like most center cockpits, is high and therefore dry."

Steve Knauth wrote a review for Soundings Magazine in 2008 and stated, "the 1980s hull design features a modified fin keel with a skeg-protected rudder. The forefoot is slightly flatter than a traditional wineglass hull, and the 13-foot beam is carried well aft for form stability and interior volume. Sail area is 743 square feet, with a 338-square-foot main and 405-square-foot foretriangle. The center cockpit is farther aft than some designs, and it’s high and dry."

See also
List of sailing boat types

Similar sailboats
Baltic 40
Bayfield 40
Bermuda 40
Bristol 39
Bristol 40
Caliber 40
Dickerson 41
Islander 40
Lord Nelson 41
Nordic 40

References

Keelboats
1980s sailboat type designs
Sailing yachts
Sailboat type designs by Robert K. Johnson
Sailboat types built by Endeavour Yacht Corporation